"Liar, Liar" is a song written by James Donna and Denny Craswell, and originally recorded by American rock band the Castaways in 1965.

Original version
"Liar, Liar" was the first and only hit single by the Castaways. The song peaked at number 12 on the Billboard Hot 100 in 1965. The producer for the track was Timothy D. Kehr. Guitarist Robert Folschow contributed the distinctive falsetto vocal on "Liar, Liar".

The Castaways performed "Liar, Liar" in the 1967 beach party film It's a Bikini World. The song also appears on the 1972 compilation album Nuggets: Original Artyfacts from the First Psychedelic Era, 1965–1968.

Debbie Harry version

"Liar, Liar" was recorded by American singer Debbie Harry for the soundtrack to the 1988 film Married to the Mob, and produced by Mike Chapman. It was their first collaboration since the 1982 Blondie album The Hunter. The following year, the two would team up again for Harry's album Def, Dumb and Blonde. A music video, co-directed by Adam Bernstein, was produced to promote the single. The song debuted and peaked at number 14 on Billboard Modern Rock Tracks chart for the week ending September 10, 1988.

Track listings
7-inch single
A. "Liar, Liar" – 3:01
B. "Queen of Voudou" (performed by the Voodooist Corporation) – 3:39

12-inch single
A. "Liar, Liar" (extended version) – 5:45
B1. "Liar, Liar" (7″ version) – 3:01
B2. "Liar, Liar" (instrumental) – 4:50

Charts

References

1965 singles
1965 songs
1988 singles
American garage rock songs
Debbie Harry songs
Protopunk songs
Reprise Records singles
Song recordings produced by Mike Chapman